Felix Luk Ping Chung (born 7 May 1994) is a former Hong Kong professional footballer and current amateur player for Hong Kong First Division club South China.

Early career
As a youngster, Luk participated in annual summer soccer camps in Hong Kong, sponsored by McDonald's. He initially played as a forward but because his technical ability was poor, he later switched to goalkeeper.

While growing up in Tuen Mun, Luk joined a youth football program run by the father of Tsun Dai. During this time, he was coached by former South China star Shum Kwok Pui. Following Eastern's promotion to the 2007–08 Hong Kong First Division, the club absorbed the program under their academy system and Luk trained as an Eastern youth player for the season. At the conclusion of the season, Luk left to join Hong Kong Rangers' academy for a season.

Club career
In 2010–11, Tuen Mun was promoted to the Hong Kong First Division and offered Luk a professional contract. Because Luk was 16 at the time, he needed his parents to co-sign the contract and as well, he was restricted to only one training session a week with the club. Despite beginning the season as Tuen Mun's third choice keeper, Luk earned his first start on 23 April 2011 in a 2–1 loss to Sun Hei.

During the 2013–14 season, Tuen Mun was expelled from the league halfway through the season, leading to the cancellation of Luk's contract. The following summer, Luk signed with Yuen Long after being lured by the opportunity to work with head coach Fung Hoi Man.

Upon Fung's departure to Hong Kong Rangers ahead of the 2016–17 season, Luk followed him. He won the starting job midway through the season when first choice keeper Chiu Yu Ming suddenly quit the club in order to become a C&ED officer.

Ahead of the 2017–18 season, Lee & Man decided to withdraw their sponsorship of Rangers in order to form their own club in the Hong Kong Premier League. Both Luk and Fung decided to join Lee Man. For the first time in his career, Luk became the first choice keeper for his club and started all 18 league matches for Lee Man.

On 24 July 2018, following a preseason friendly, Hoi King confirmed that they had signed Luk. This marked the third time Luk had followed Fung to a new club, the fourth time he has played for him and the first time Luk had done so for a club which was owned by Fung.

On 29 July 2019, Tai Po revealed that Luk would join the club.

On 20 October 2020, Luk was named as one of 17 new players for Pegasus.

After a brief period with Pegasus, he joined Hong Kong First Division League club South China in 2021.

Personal life
Luk retired from professional football in 2021 and is now a high school teacher.

References

External links

Felix Luk at HKFA

 

Hong Kong footballers
Hong Kong First Division League players
Hong Kong Premier League players
Tuen Mun SA players
Yuen Long FC players
Hong Kong Rangers FC players
Lee Man FC players
Hoi King SA players
Tai Po FC players
TSW Pegasus FC players
Hong Kong people
Association football goalkeepers
1994 births
Living people